Mugaliyachhap, also called Mungaliya Chhap, is a village in the Bhopal district of Madhya Pradesh, India. It is located in the Huzur tehsil and the Phanda block.

In 2014, the foundation of Deendayal Shramodaya Vidyalaya, a school for children of labourers, was laid in the village. The Chief Minister Shivraj Singh Chouhan also announced that an Industrial Training Institute (ITI) would be set up in the village.

Mugaliyachhap is the second most populous village in the Huzur tehsil. The village has an ancient Hanuman temple, where Ramayana recitation ceremonies have been conducted since 2006. The village is also home to the Jagran Lakecity University.

Demographics 

According to the 2011 census of India, Mugaliyachhap has 792 households. The effective literacy rate (i.e. the literacy rate of population excluding children aged 6 and below) is 65.26%.

References 

Villages in Huzur tehsil